Passira is a municipality in the state of Pernambuco, Brazil.

Geography

 Region - Agreste Pernambucano
 Boundaries - Limoeiro and Salgadinho   (N); Gravatá, Bezerros and Pombos   (S);  Cumaru   (W);  Feira Nova and Glória do Goitá   (E)
 Area - 329.75 km²
 Elevation - 176 m
 Hydrography - Capibaribe river
 Vegetation - Caatinga  hipoxerófila
 Climate - semi arid hot
 Average annual temperature - 24.1 °C
 Distance to Recife - 115 km
 Population - 28,894 (2020)

Economy

The main economic activities in Passira are based in commerce and agribusiness, especially tomatoes, corn and beans, and the rearing of cattle, goats, sheep and horses.

Economic Indicators

Economy by Sector
2006

Health Indicators

References

Municipalities in Pernambuco